The 2017–18 Santosh Trophy qualifiers was the qualifying round for the 72nd edition of the Santosh Trophy, the premier competition in India for teams representing their regional and state football associations.

North Zone
The North Zone matches of the Santosh Trophy qualifiers were scheduled to start on 15 January 2018 in Uttar Pradesh. The North Zone qualifiers consisted of eight teams divided into two groups.

Group A

Group B

East Zone
The East Zone qualifiers consisted of six teams divided into two groups of three.

Group A

Group B

North-East Zone

Group A

Group B

West Zone

Group A

Group B

South Zone
The South Zone qualifiers consisted of eight teams divided into two groups of four. Matches were held at the Bangalore Football Stadium in Bangalore, Karnataka from 16 January to 22 January 2018.

In Group B, Andaman and Nicobar withdrew just before the qualifiers due to lack of funds to travel to Bangalore.

Group A

Group B

References

External links
 Santosh Trophy on the All India Football Federation website .

2017–18 Santosh Trophy